The Frankfurt Declaration is the general name that refers to the set of principles titled Aims and Tasks of Democratic Socialism issued on 3 July 1951 by the Socialist International in Frankfurt, West Germany. The Declaration condemned capitalism for placing the "rights of ownership before the rights of man", allowing economic inequality and its historical support of imperialism and fascism.

It declared that capitalism has coincided with "devastating crises and mass unemployment". It praised the development of the welfare state as challenging capitalism and declared its opposition to Bolshevik communism. It declared that socialism was an international movement that was plural in nature that required different approaches in different circumstances. However, the Declaration stated that true socialism could only be achieved through democracy. According to the Declaration, the economic goals of socialism include full employment, the welfare state and achievement of public ownership through a variety of means, including nationalization, creation of cooperatives to counter capitalist private enterprise and/or securing rights for trade unions.

The Declaration stated that economic and social planning did not necessarily have to be achieved in a centralized form, but it could also be achieved in decentralized forms. The Declaration denounced that all forms of discrimination whether economic, legal, or political must be abolished, including discrimination against women, races, regions and other social groups. The Declaration denounced all forms of colonialism and imperialism.

The Frankfurt Declaration was updated at the 18th Congress of the Socialist International in Stockholm in June 1989.

Articles of principles of the Frankfurt Declaration

See also 

 Social democracy

References 

1951 documents
Social democracy
Socialism
Socialist International